Juan Cruz Kaprof (born 12 March 1995) is an Argentine professional footballer who plays as a forward for Central Córdoba.

Career

River Plate
Born in Buenos Aires, Kaprof is a youth exponent from River Plate. He made his league debut at 19 August 2013 in a 0–0 away draw against Godoy Cruz Antonio Tomba replacing Giovanni Simeone after 69 minutes.

Lecco
On 1 February 2021, his contract with Lecco was terminated by mutual consent.

Honours
River Plate
Argentina Primera Division: 2014 Final
Copa Sudamericana: 2014

LDU Quito
Supercopa Ecuador: 2021

References

External links

1995 births
Living people
Footballers from Buenos Aires
Association football forwards
Argentine footballers
Argentine expatriate footballers
Argentine Primera División players
Club Atlético River Plate footballers
FC Metz players
Defensa y Justicia footballers
Atlético Tucumán footballers
Arsenal de Sarandí footballers
Calcio Lecco 1912 players
L.D.U. Quito footballers
Central Córdoba de Santiago del Estero footballers
Serie C players
Ecuadorian Serie A players
Ligue 2 players
Argentine expatriate sportspeople in France
Argentine expatriate sportspeople in Italy
Expatriate footballers in France
Expatriate footballers in Italy